The WhatsOnStage Award for Best Performer in a Male Identifying Role in a Musical is an annual award presented by WhatsOnStage.com as part of the annual WhatsOnStage Awards. Founded in 2001 as the Theatregoers' Choice Awards, the WhatsOnStage Awards are based on a popular vote recognising performers and productions in London's West End theatre.

This award is given to a person who has performed a leading male identifying role in a musical during the eligibility year. Introduced in 2001 as the award for Best Actor in a Musical, the category was renamed in 2022 in an effort to be more inclusive. The category was discontinued following the 2022 ceremony and was replaced with the gender-neutral WhatsOnstage Award for Best Performer in a Musical.

First presented to Daniel Evans at the inaugural ceremony, Michael Ball is the only performer to win the award twice. Julian Ovenden holds the record for most nominations without a win in this category, with four.

Winners and nominees

2000s

2010s

2020s

Multiple wins and nominations

Wins
2 wins
 Michael Ball

Nominations
4 nominations
 Michael Ball
 Julian Ovenden

3 nominations
 Killian Donnelly
 Daniel Evans
 Douglas Hodge
 Philip Quast

2 nominations

References

External links
 Official website

British theatre awards